Eleno de Céspedes, also known as Elena de Céspedes (1545 – died after 1588), was a Spanish surgeon who married a man and later a woman, and was tried by the Spanish Inquisition. Céspedes may have been an intersex and/or transgender person, or, if a woman, may have been a lesbian and/or the first female surgeon known in Spain and perhaps in Europe.

Early life, first marriage, and travels
Elena de Céspedes was born around 1545 in Alhama de Granada in Andalusia, Spain, to an enslaved black Muslim woman named Francisca de Medina and a free, Christian, Castilian peasant named Pero Hernández.
 Born into slavery, and branded on the cheeks as the mulatto offspring of a slave, Céspedes was freed as a child (and took the surname of a former owner's wife), and married a stonemason named Cristóbal Lombardo at age fifteen or sixteen. Within a few months, while Céspedes was pregnant with his child, Lombardo left because the two did not get along. According to Céspedes, Lombardo died some time later.

Céspedes said that an intersex condition became apparent while giving birth, and after giving birth, Céspedes left the baby boy (named Cristóbal after his father) with a friend and began to travel around Spain, working in various professions including as a tailor. After a fight during which Céspedes stabbed a pimp (and was jailed for a time), he began to wear men's instead of women's clothing, use the masculine name Eleno, and openly court women.

Céspedes then found work as a farmhand and shepherd, but an acquaintance denounced him to the corregidor who arrested him, and released him only on condition that he dress as a woman. Undeterred, he resumed dressing as a man and found work as a soldier, putting down the Morisco Revolt. Céspedes, who was literate, then purchased several books on surgery and medicine, and with these and the help of a Valencian surgeon he had befriended, trained himself to be a surgeon in Madrid.

Second marriage, arrest, and trial

In December 1584, Céspedes and a woman named María del Caño, the daughter of an artisan, applied to marry. Because Céspedes lacked facial hair, the vicar of Madrid, Juan Baptista Neroni, questioned if Céspedes was a eunuch; at either Céspedes's or Neroni's request, four men (including a doctor) examined Céspedes (from the front only) in Yepes and attested he had male genitalia and was not a eunuch, whereupon he and Caño were given a license to marry.

After the banns were announced, however, two townspeople told the priest Céspedes was "male and female", with genitalia of both sexes; the priest refused to perform the marriage, and Neroni arranged for a second examination to be performed by Francisco Díaz (Philip II's doctor and a noted urologist) and Madrid doctor Antonio Mantilla on 17 February 1586. They reported Céspedes had a normal penis and testicles, as well as a crease and aperture between them and the anus (which might indicate a vagina). In 1586, when Céspedes was forty and Caño was twenty-four, the couple were finally married; they lived together in Yepes in the vicinity of Toledo, Spain for a year.

In June 1587, acting on a neighbor's accusation, the couple were arrested, charged with "sodomy", and imprisoned in the municipal jail in Ocaña, Spain. On 4 July 1587, the bailiff formally accused Céspedes of (besides sodomy) pretending to be a man, using witchcraft to appear as a man to earlier medical examiners, engaging in transvestism and, by marrying a woman, mocking the sanctity of marriage. Céspedes argued that, because he had a penis when he married Caño, the marriage was legitimate. The bailiff asked the vicar general to punish the couple severely; the penalty for female homosexuality was death. However, the Toledo tribunal of the Spanish Inquisition ordered the secular and episcopal authorities to turn the case over to them, because the charge of witchcraft was within the Inquisition's jurisdiction; the couple were therefore transferred to an Inquisition jail in Toledo.

Inquisitors focused on Céspedes's claim to be, in the parlance of the time, a hermaphrodite; Céspedes argued this state made both marriages licit, as he had been a woman during the first marriage and when he had had sexual intercourse with men, and it was only after a male organ appeared when he gave birth that he went on to have intercourse with women and marry Caño; he argued this natural (intersex/hermaphroditic) condition also made the witchcraft charge, of having the devil's aid in appearing as a man or woman, unfounded. He said the penis-like organ first emerged after childbirth, became engorged when aroused, and retracted inside of him otherwise. He said this organ was initially curved downward by skin, but a surgeon was able to successfully sever this skin.

Thereafter, he said, he urinated through his penis and usually ejaculated, and he gave the names of previous partners who could attest to his sex; during the trial, several doctors, female lovers, and male friends testified they had viewed Céspedes as a man. In turn, midwives who examined and penetrated what they interpreted as Céspedes's vagina with a candle and fingers found it so tight and resistant to penetration that they concluded Céspedes was not only female but a virgin. To explain the lack of visible evidence of a penis, Eleno said it had been injured and amputated shortly before his imprisonment, following a riding injury. The Inquisition also ordered Francisco Díaz to perform a second examination; this time, Díaz found only female genitalia, but maintained he had seen male genitals during his earlier examination.

Many of the physical signs inquisitors focused on were also racial; they noted, for example, that Céspedes had no facial hair and had pierced ears, like a (Castilian) woman; Lisa Vollendorf says that Caño is not recorded as indicating whether she thought, for example, that mulattoes might have less facial hair than Castilians or that enslaved people often pierced their ears. Inquisitors also argued Caño should have noticed when Céspedes menstruated, which Céspedes said he had done, though he had always had an infrequent cycle; Caño said that when Céspedes had blood on his nightshirt, he told her it was from bleeding (of hemorrhoids or wounds) caused by horseback riding.

Verdict and sentence
The medical examiners at Toledo said Céspedes was and had always been female, but the tribunal declined to rule on the "legally messy" charges set forth by the prosecutor related to that, like sodomy or witchcraft, and convicted Céspedes only of bigamy, for failing to adequately document Lombardo's death before marrying Caño. It imposed the standard sentence imposed on male bigamists in that era, 200 lashes and ten years of confinement. Céspedes was also subjected to a public humiliation, an auto-da-fé, being paraded around Toledo's central square in a sanbenito mitre and robes.

On account of his medical skills, Céspedes was ordered to spend his ten-year sentence caring for the poor in a public hospital, initially the Hospital del Rey in Toledo. However, many people came to see and be healed by the now well-known Céspedes, so on 23 February 1589 the administrator there requested Céspedes be transferred to a more remote facility, saying his presence was causing an "annoyance and embarrassment". The tribunal exonerated Caño of knowingly doing anything wrong, and released her.

Sex, gender, and sexuality
Various historical and medical studies of Céspedes's case have attempted to classify the Spaniard as intersex, as transsexual, or as a hypospadic male; other authors have viewed Céspedes as a lesbian woman (who may have adopted male clothes to acquire more social freedom), as transgender (perhaps a trans man whose claims of being a "hermaphrodite" were attempts to explain his gender dysphoria without a specific word for it), or as non-binary, defying a binary model of gender and sex. Lisa Vollendorf says that while "even when medical doctors provided contradictory evidence, the Inquisition maintained that sex was an indisputable material fact" (displaying, she says, "an almost fetishistic interest in Céspedes's genitalia"), Céspedes described not only his physiology but also gave "behavioral and psychological explanations for his masculinity" he had lived for decades, and drew on his knowledge of medicine and history and cited Aristotle, Augustine, Cicero, and Pliny in arguing that his intersex body was not "unnatural or unprecedented". Most information about Céspedes stems from the trial, and testimony during it. If a woman, Céspedes would be the first known female surgeon in Spain and perhaps Europe.

During the trial, inquisitorial scribes inconsistently used both masculine and feminine pronouns to refer to Céspedes, while in his own testimony he consistently described himself with masculine terms.

See also
 Catalina de Erauso (1585–1650), Spanish nun and conquistador
 Fernanda Fernández (1755–fl. 1792), Spanish intersex nun

Footnotes

References

External links 
 

Spanish surgeons
People from Granada
Year of birth unknown
Year of death unknown
16th-century LGBT people
16th-century Spanish physicians
Intersex men
Intersex military personnel
1545 births
Freedmen
Spanish slaves
16th-century slaves
LGBT physicians
Historical figures with ambiguous or disputed gender identity
Witch trials in Spain